Because of the Snake River's geographical isolation there are a number of plants that have evolved in Hells Canyon that grow nowhere else on earth. Though some species are more widespread, the specific varieties of the species are not.

List of plants endemic to Hells Canyon

Arabis crucisetosa Constance and Rollins
Arabis hastatula Greene
Astragalus arthurii M.E.Jones
Astragalus vallaris M.E.Jones
Calochortus macrocarpus var. maculosus (A.Nels. & J.F.Macbr.) A.Nels. & J.F.Macbr.
Lomatium rollinsii Mathias and Constance
Lomatium serpentinum (M.E.Jones) Mathias
Mimulus hymenophyllus R.J. Meinke
Phlox colubrina Wherry and Constance
Ribes cereum var. colubrinum C.L.Hitchc.
Rubus bartonianus M.E.Peck

References

Hells Canyon
Endemic flora of Oregon
Hells Canyon
Flora of Oregon
Flora of Idaho